Belleville, also known as Bellville or The Ponds, is an unincorporated community in Conecuh County, Alabama, United States.

History
Belleville was originally known as The Ponds due to a large number of ponds in the area. It was then named Belleville in honor of John Bell, who initiated a project to drain the ponds. The first settlers in Conecuh County settled in Belleville. Belleville was formerly home to multiple churches, five grist mills, three general stores, a barbershop, a lumber mill, and a hotel.

A post office operated under the name Belleville from 1828 to 1957.

References

Unincorporated communities in Conecuh County, Alabama
Unincorporated communities in Alabama